David Wrobel (born 13 February 1991) is a German athlete specialising in the discus throw. He represented his country at the 2019 World Athletics Championships without qualifying for the final.

His personal best in the event is 67.30 metres set in Werferzentrum Brandberge, Halle in 2021.

International competitions

References

External links
Official site

1991 births
Living people
German male discus throwers
World Athletics Championships athletes for Germany
SC Magdeburg athletes
Athletes (track and field) at the 2020 Summer Olympics
Olympic athletes of Germany
Sportspeople from Stuttgart